Sylvain Abdullah Idingar (born 8 March 1984) is a Chadian footballer who plays as a striker for Limonest. In 2014, he made an appearance for the Chad national football team.

Career
Idingar began his professional career in 2003 at Lyon. He played one game in the Champions League on 8 December 2004 scoring one goal in the 5–0 win against Sparta Prague. 

In June 2005 Indingar moved on loan to Valenciennes where he played 5 games in Ligue 2 before going back to Lyon. In June 2007 he left Lyon and moved to Al-Watani. He moved again in 2008 move to ES Sétif.

Idangar had a brief spell with C.D. Feirense in Portugal's LigaPro.

After several years playing abroad, Idangar returned to the Lyon metropolitan area, where he played with amateurs ASM Venissieux, AS Lyon-Duchère and FC Bords de Saône.

Personal
Idangar was a roommate of France international footballer Hatem Ben Arfa during his spell at SO Cassis Carnoux, while Ben Arfa was playing for neighboring club Olympique de Marseille. They first met as youth players at Lyon, and are now best friends.

Honours
Valenciennes
 D2: 2006

See also
 List of Chad international footballers

References

External links
 
 Profile at footballdatabase.eu

1984 births
Living people
Association football forwards
French footballers
French sportspeople of Chadian descent
Black French sportspeople
Footballers from Paris
Olympique Lyonnais players
Valenciennes FC players
Al-Watani Club players
ES Sétif players
SO Cassis Carnoux players
C.D. Feirense players
French expatriate sportspeople in Algeria
Expatriate footballers in Algeria
Expatriate footballers in Thailand
France youth international footballers
Chadian footballers
Chad international footballers
Chadian expatriate sportspeople in Algeria